Andrew D. Weyman is an American television director, producer and psychologist.

Life and career
He was born and raised in Brooklyn, New York and educated at Kingsborough Community College and Brooklyn College. Later in life he became an academic at Bath University, where he worked as a psychologist.  He now lives with his partner in Gloucestershire, UK.

His directing and producing credits include:

The King of Queens, The Ellen Show, The Big Bang Theory, Cybill, Two and a Half Men, Yes, Dear, Bette, Lucky Louie, The Gregory Hines Show, Work with Me, Still Standing, Listen Up!, The Brian Benben Show, Joey, Life on a Stick, The Martin Short Show, Roseanne, Trial and Error, Ellen, All-American Girl, The Jackie Thomas Show, Bob, The Fanelli Boys, Carol & Company, My Two Dads, Head of the Class, Santa Barbara, Joe's Life, The Cavanaughs, Loving, Texas, Another World, As the World Turns, The Edge of Night, Guiding Light, Search for Tomorrow and Ned & Stacey.

Awards and nominations
Nominated for a 1980 Daytime Emmy Award for Outstanding Direction For A Daytime Drama Series: Another World. He shared this nomination with Ira Cirker, Melvin Bernhardt, Robert Calhoun, Barnet Kellman and Jack Hofsiss.

In 2018 he was nominated for, and won, the award for 'Most unusual Lecturer at Bath University'

References

University of Bath

American television directors
Television producers from New York City
Brooklyn College alumni
Living people
People from Brooklyn
Year of birth missing (living people)